Antigua & Barbuda was represented at the 2006 Commonwealth Games in Melbourne by a contingent comprising 18 sportspersons.  Even though the nation did not earn a medal at these Games, the 4 x 100 relay team, featuring N'Kosie Barnes, Ivan Miller, Daniel Bailey, and anchor Brendan Christian, broke the Antigua & Barbuda national 4 x 100 record in the heats with a time of 39.9 seconds, and placed fifth in the finals.

Competitors

The following is the list of number of competitors participating in the Games.

Athletics

Men
Track

Field

Women
Track

Key
Note–Ranks given for track events are within the athlete's heat only
Q = Qualified for the next round
q = Qualified for the next round as a fastest loser or, in field events, by position without achieving the qualifying target
NR = National record
WB = World Best
N/A = Round not applicable for the event
Bye = Athlete not required to compete in round

Cycling

Road

Men

Shooting

Men

Open

Swimming

Women

Triathlon

Antigua and Barbuda at the Commonwealth Games
Nations at the 2006 Commonwealth Games
Commonwealth